Tous les soleils is a 2011 French film written and directed by Philippe Claudel.

Plot
Alessandro is an Italian teacher who is determined to be a good father for his teenage daughter Irina. This is impeded by Alessandro's brother Crampone who lives in the same household and who never ceased to foster revolutionary political ideas.

Selected cast
Stefano Accorsi as Alessandro
Neri Marcorè as Luigi aka Crampone
Clotilde Courau as Florence
Lisa Cipriani as Irina
Anouk Aimée as Agathe
Philippe Rebbot as Jean-Paul
Émilie Gavois-Kahn as The letter carrier

References

External links
 
 

2011 films
Films set in France
French comedy films
2010s French-language films
Films directed by Philippe Claudel
2010s French films
Films shot in Alsace